The Committee for the Liberation of the Peoples of Russia (abbreviated as) was a committee composed of military and civilian Nazi collaborators from territories of the Soviet Union (most being Russians). It was founded by Nazi Germany on 14 November 1944, in Prague, Protectorate of Bohemia and Moravia (purposely chosen because it was a Slavic city that was still under Axis control).

Stated goals
The goals of the committee were embodied in a document known as the Prague Manifesto. The manifesto's fourteen points guaranteed the freedom of speech, press, religion, and assembly, as well as a right to self-determination of any ethnic group living in territories belonging to Russia. The Prague Manifesto did not contain any explicit anti-semitic or other racially inspired rhetoric, which caused a conflict with many Nazi propagandists. However, criticism aimed at the Western Allies (specifically US and UK) was included in the manifesto's preamble. The chairman of the committee was General Andrey Vlasov, who also commanded the Russian Liberation Army. The committee was viewed as the political arm of the Russian Liberation Army, although it also united several Ukrainian and other ethnic forces that were anti-Soviet.

After the surrender of Germany to the Allies, the committee ceased to operate. During the immediate post-war period, several new organisations sprang up that intended to continue the committee's goal of fighting communism (i.e., the Union of the St. Andrew Flag; the Committee of United Vlasovites; the Union of Battle for the Liberation of the Peoples of Russia), started by veterans of the committee and the Russian Liberation Army who managed to escape forced repatriation to the Soviet Union. Two latter organisations participated in US-led efforts to form a united anti-Soviet platform of Soviet emigres.

In the United States, a CIA-led organisation with a similar name, the American Committee for the Liberation of the Peoples of Russia, was founded in the late 1940s, and became known for their propaganda broadcaster Radio Liberty, which was run by the Central Intelligence Agency and later funded by the United States Congress. It operated from Munich, in West Germany.

Gallery

See also

 Russian Liberation Movement
 National Committee for a Free Germany
 Ukrainian National Committee

World War II non-governmental organizations
Politics of the Soviet Union
Germany–Soviet Union relations
Organizations established in 1944
Organizations disestablished in 1945
Anti-communist organizations
Russian collaborators with Nazi Germany
Governments in exile during World War II